The SAP CRM applications have been initially an integrated on-premises customer relationship management (CRM) software manufactured by SAP SE which targeted business software requirements for marketing, sales and service of midsize and large organizations in all industries and sectors. The first SAP CRM release 2.0 has been made generally available in November 2000. The current release 7.0 is being updated with quarterly enhancement packs (EHPs) since 2009.

In 2007 SAP started to develop a cloud based CRM which has been renamed from SAP Business ByDesign CRM to Sales on Demand to SAP Cloud for Customer and finally to SAP Cloud for Sales. Since 2018 SAP has consolidated all of its cloud based marketing, sales, service and commerce applications as SAP C/4HANA suite.

Overview 
After the acquisition of Hybris in 2013, SAP has gradually realigned their CRM strategy mainly to take on the market leader Salesforce.com which is a cloud-based software. In a bid to be more competitive and future focused, SAP has been shifting towards cloud based CRM applications since 2011 rather than traditional on-premises software. Still SAP CRM is being used by thousands of companies and there are according to SAP no plans to sunset the product.

SAP has consolidated its CRM applications under the terms "Customer Engagement and Commerce" (CEC) and since 2018 under "Customer Experience" (CX). SAP offers a variety of (partially acquired) applications:

 Customer Profile Management
 SAP Customer Data Cloud (acquired and formerly known as Gigya)
Marketing
 SAP Marketing Cloud (formerly known as SAP Hybris Marketing)
SAP CRM Marketing (On Premises)
 Commerce
 SAP Commerce Cloud (acquired and formerly known as Hybris Commerce)
Sales
 SAP Sales Cloud (formerly known as Cloud for Sales or C4C)
Callidus Cloud CPQ (acquired)
 SAP CRM Sales (On Premises)
 Service
 SAP Service Cloud (formerly known as Cloud for Service or C4S)
SAP Customer Engagement Center (formerly known as Hybris Service Engagement Center)
Core Systems (acquired)
 SAP CRM Service (On Premises)
SAP CRM Interaction Center (On Premises)
 Billing
 SAP Subscription Billing (formerly known as Hybris Revenue Cloud)
SAP Billing and Revenue Management (On Premises and formerly known as SAP BRIM or Hybris Billing)

History 
SAP started working on CRM related capabilities in the early 1990s as embedded CRM modules of the SAP R/3 ERP. The "Sales and Distribution" (SD) module of SAP R/3 ERP covered functionalities for:

 Customer management and Product catalog (MM).
 Pre-sales actions for inquiry, activities and quotation management.
 Sales order and delivery management
 Pricing, tax and billing including credit management

SAP offered its first stand-alone CRM software in 2000. The initial release of "SAP CRM" 2.0 had been pushed by the acquisition of the German salesforce automation specialist Kiefer & Veittinger with its "Mobile Sales" application.

In parallel to the new focus for stand-alone SAP CRM, SAP continued to invest in the embedded CRM scenarios as part of its ERP software in 2005. This allowed SAP in 2007 to copy the CRM codeline from the newly developed cloud ERP SAP Business ByDesign and to create the independent "Cloud for Sales" and "Cloud for Service" applications (also known as "Cloud for Customer"). Another example for this copy and paste approach was the decision to move the SAP CRM codelines for service and sales into the S/4HANA ERP which allowed SAP to offer the new "S/4HANA for Customer Management" option.

Major milestones of the SAP CRM development:

SAP R/3 Sales and Distribution (SD) was initially released as part of R/3 Enterprise Edition 1.0 A in 1992
SAP CRM 2000 (2.0) initially released in 2000
SAP CRM 2006 (5.0) released in 2005
SAP CRM 2007 (6.0) released in 2007
SAP CRM 2008 (7.0) released in 2009 as Part of SAP Business Suite 7.0
SAP Business ByDesign Cloud ERP including CRM initially released in 2007
SAP Cloud for Customer initially released in 2011
Hybris acquisition in 2013 and afterwards renaming of its CRM portfolio to SAP Hybris Customer Engagement and Commerce in 2014
CallidusCloud (CPQ, Sales Enablement) and Coresystems (Field Service) acquisition in 2018
Introduction of SAP S/4HANA for Customer Management in 2018 which added the SAP CRM 7.0 service and sales capabilities to S/4HANA ERP core
SAP C/4HANA Customer Experience announced 2018. SAP C/4HANA is an umbrella term for SAP’s combined customer experience solutions. After completing acquisitions of market leaders such as Hybris, Gigya and CallidusCloud, SAP C/4HANA  now ties together solutions to support all front-office functions, including consumer data protection, marketing, commerce, sales and customer service. It is an integrated portfolio of cloud solutions, designed to modernise the sales-only focus of legacy CRM products.

See also 
 List of SAP products

References

Sources
 
 Kalaimani J. (2016) Implementing SAP CRM 7. In: SAP Project Management Pitfalls. Apress, Berkeley, CA. 
 Yi Wu and Fengping Wu, "Notice of Retraction: Researches on SAP-CRM's application in cigarette manufacturing factory," 2011 2nd International Conference on Artificial Intelligence, Management Science and Electronic Commerce (AIMSEC), 2011, pp. 4762-4765, .
 A. D. Berdie, M. Osaci, I. Muscalagiu and G. Prostean, "A case-study about a web business application implemented in different SAP UI technologies," 2012 7th IEEE International Symposium on Applied Computational Intelligence and Informatics (SACI), 2012, pp. 111-114, .

External links 
 

SAP SE
Customer relationship management software
1992 software